Clive Morris Brown (born 31 December 1946) is an Australian former politician and minister in the Gallop Government. Brown was a member of the Western Australian Legislative Assembly between 1993 and 2005 for the electorates of Bassendean and previously a member for the Morley from 1993 until its abolition in 1996.

Biography
Brown was born in 1946 in London, England. He arrived in Western Australia as a child in 1956.

Before entering politics, Brown worked in the trade union movement.

Political career
He was elected to the electorate of Bassendean in the Western Australian Legislative Assembly at the 1993 Western Australian election. Between 1994 and 2001 Brown served in a number of roles in the Labor shadow cabinet.

After Labor's win at the 2001 Western Australian election, Brown joined Premier Geoff Gallop's cabinet, becoming Minister for State Development. He held this role until his retirement before the 2005 Western Australian election. In announcing his intention to retire in 2004, he cited a desire to enter business.

References

1946 births
Living people
British emigrants to Australia
Members of the Western Australian Legislative Assembly
Australian Labor Party members of the Parliament of Western Australia
21st-century Australian politicians